Hat Khuat ("Bottle Beach") is a beach on the northern portion of Ko Pha-ngan, Thailand.  It was named Bottle Beach for its protected cove and due to the shape of the cove which can be seen from the rock, which resembles the shape of a bottle. 
There is a rough track to the beach but it is easiest to reach by boat.

References 

Beaches of Thailand